The Regional Council of Normandy is the executive body for the French Region of Normandy since its creation on January 1, 2016.  

Hervé Morin has served as the president of the Regional Council since January 4, 2016. The Regional Council has its offices in Caen at the former Abbey of Sainte-Trinité, where the now-defunct Regional Council of Lower Normandy was located until 2016, and in Rouen.

References

Government of Normandy
Normandy